Parpar Nechmad (Nice Butterfly) is a long-running Israeli children's television program, aimed mainly at pre-schoolers. The show premiered in January 1982 and ran until 2004. It was produced by the Israeli Educational Television (IETV), and to this day remains successful in re-runs on the IETV's former home network, Channel 23, and via a reboot to the series that debuted on 5 September 2021 on Kan Educational.

The show was originally produced by Shoshana Tzachor. The puppets were all designed by Yehudit Greenspan. The show's title refers to a then well-known nursery rhyme by Fania Bergstein.

Overview 
The show consists of interactions between humans and puppets. Each episode presents the young viewers with familiar situations from everyday life, and offers creative ways of solving various problems, as each situation is dealt with through songs and games. Aside from the basic plotline, most episodes also include a story told by one or more of the human actors, and sometimes short cartoon sketches. In the sketches about Pete and Pitagoras (different actors) professor Pitagoras tried to teach the kids but his assistant Pete always ruined everything.

The location for most shows (until 1995) is a room filled with various shapes, such as poles and arches, vaguely resembling a room in a house. This deliberately surreal design is meant to give the impression of seeing the world from an infant's point of view, which is full of imagination and creativity.

Reboot 
In 1995 the show's production was put on a long hiatus following the death of Yoni Chen, one of the puppeteers. It was relaunched in 1998 with a renewed and very different look. It now had a realistic house and backyard as the two main locations. The puppets were redesigned and there were considerable changes in the human cast as well.

Responses for the new version were mostly negative. Original creator Datia Ben Dor said in an interview (translation from Hebrew is non-literal): "The work on the show was no longer done with the proper care and sensitivity... it was no longer "Parpar Nechmad"... the name remained but the essence was gone". The second version aired its final episode in 2004.

On 18 July 2008 it was first revealed that Israeli Educational Television planned to reboot the show again, and that auditions for the new human cast would soon take place. Reportedly, all four puppet characters would appear on the new version, which would focus on teaching children about good nutrition and health. After some time, the new version was cancelled.

In February 2020, it was announced that IPBC planned to reboot the show after 16 years of reruns on Kan Educational.

Ami Weinberg and Ayelet Levine will return to perform Batz and Nuli, Shabi will performed by Gilles Ben David instead of Avi Yakir and Uza will performed by Meital Raz instead of Irit Shilo. The puppets were all redesigned by Maria Gurevich.

The revival series premiered on Kan Educational on 5 September 2021.

Cast

Puppet Characters 
 Uza (אוזה) (performer: Irit Shilo / Meital Raz) - a female goose. She is very clever and a fast learner. Her character traits are those of a know-it-all big sister.
 Shabi (שבי) (performer: Itzik Gier / Avi Yakir / Gilles Ben David) – a male snail. He is intelligent but slightly insecure. He tends to rely on Uza for answers. He wears round glasses.
 Batz (בץ) (performer: Yoni Chen / Ami Weinberg) – a male turtle. He is a rather slow thinker, but far from being dumb.
 Nuli (נולי) (performer: Ayelet Levine / Tzlila Yanai) – a female chick. The youngest of the puppets, she is inquisitive and gets excited easily. Her name is not related to the animal she is. She is named after Nuli Omer.
 Pingi (פינגי) (performer: Galia Yishai) – a human-sized penguin. He joins the show in later episodes as an immigrant from the North Pole, and is very curious and friendly, yet tends to be obnoxious at times. His character was excluded from the new version, mostly because most viewers found him annoying. For example, he really wanted glasses but after he got a couple (actually faux glasses) he really wanted a moustache.

Human Actors 
 Efi Ben Israel
 Uzi Hitman
 Dudu Zar
 Ofra Weingarten
 Shlomit Hagoel
 Guy Friedman
 Elinor Aharon
 Ofra Haza (frequent guest in early episodes)

2021 Edition 
 Meshi Kleinstein
 Uri Banai
 Ester Rada 
 Ben Yossipovich

References

External links 
 Parpar Nechmad - Classic seasons, on Kan Educational.
 Parpar Nechmad - New season, on Kan Educational.

Israeli children's television series
Israeli television shows featuring puppetry
Israeli Educational Television
1982 Israeli television series debuts
2004 Israeli television series endings
2021 Israeli television series debuts
1980s Israeli television series
1990s Israeli television series
2000s Israeli television series
2020s Israeli television series
Television series revived after cancellation